Leonardo Graziano (born November 15, 1975) is an Italian voice actor.

Biography
Graziano is well known for being the Italian voice of Naruto Uzumaki in Naruto and Naruto: Shippuden as well as dubbing Itsuki Koizumi in the Italian-language version of The Melancholy of Haruhi Suzumiya. He also voiced Dan Kuso in the Italian version of the Bakugan series.

In Graziano's live action dubbing roles, he is the official Italian voice actor of Jim Parsons as he most notably dubbed Sheldon Cooper in the Italian-language version of The Big Bang Theory. He work at dubbing studios both in Rome and in Milan.

Dubbing roles

Animation
 Dan Kuso in Bakugan Battle Brawlers
 Dan Kuso in Bakugan Battle Brawlers: New Vestroia
 Dan Kuso in Bakugan: Gundalian Invaders
 Dan Kuso in Bakugan: Mechtanium Surge
 Naruto Uzumaki in Naruto and Naruto: Shippuden
 Naruto Uzumaki in Naruto the Movie: Ninja Clash in the Land of Snow
 Coco and Kokoda in Yes! Precure 5: Kagami no Kuni no Miracle Daibōken!
 Wolfie in Barbie as the Princess and the Pauper
 Steve in The Ant Bully
 Lilo & Stitch
 Syaoran Li in Cardcaptor Sakura: The Movie
 Itsuki Koizumi in The Melancholy of Haruhi Suzumiya
 Neil Goldman in Family Guy
 Axel Blaze (2nd voice) in Inazuma Eleven
 Nagisa Shirai in Mermaid Melody Pichi Pichi Pitch
 Baby Taz in Baby Looney Tunes
 Beast Boy in Teen Titans
 Homeron the Great in Blue Dragon
 Tommy Gilligan in Codename: Kids Next Door
 Tony Parsons in The Cramp Twins
 Rudy Mookich in Pinky, Elmyra & the Brain
 Touta Matsuda in Death Note
 Eiji Kikumaru in The Prince of Tennis 
 Kimiaki Shirai in Love Hina
 Killua Zoldyck in Hunter × Hunter
 Kei in Prétear
 Sarutobi Sasuke in Samurai Deeper Kyo
 Akim in Wheel Squad
 A.J. (Season 6-present) in The Fairly OddParents
 Joseph Anza in Fillmore!
 Lenny in The Polar Express
 Trent Mosely in Kamen Rider: Dragon Knight

Live action
 Sheldon Cooper in The Big Bang Theory
 Adult Sheldon Cooper in Young Sheldon
 Tyrese in Blue's Clues
 Drake Parker in Drake & Josh
 Francis of Assisi in Millions
 Rob in Feel the Noise

References

External links
 

Italian male voice actors
1975 births
Living people